Elsie Curtin  ( Needham; 4 October 1890 – 24 June 1975) was the wife of John Curtin, the 14th Prime Minister of Australia.

Biography 
Curtin was born in Ballarat, Victoria to parents Annie and Abraham Needham. From 1898 to 1910, she lived in Cape Town, Cape Colony (now Western Cape, South Africa). During the 1910s, she moved to Hobart, Tasmania, where she met John Curtin. They married in Perth, Western Australia, on 21 April 1917 and had two children.

During her husband's wartime premiership, she supported him at two homes. She arranged functions and launched ships. Her husband died in office on 5 July 1945 and she attended the public funeral. 

In 1944, she became the Labour Women's Union's Western Australian President, a role she kept until September 1946.

Curtin died on 24 June 1975 in Cottesloe.

References

1890 births
1975 deaths
Australian Commanders of the Order of the British Empire
Australian expatriates in South Africa
Burials at Karrakatta Cemetery
People from Ballarat
Spouses of prime ministers of Australia